Uladislao Augier (July 4, 1826 – January 5, 1908) was an Argentine politician and the first National Deputy for the province of Catamarca.

Argentine politicians
1826 births
1908 deaths
Argentine military personnel